Halytska Square (translit.: Ploshcha Halytska) in Kyiv, the capital of Ukraine, is a large square in the city. The square is in Shevchenkivskyi District and located on Kyiv's main westward thoroughfare (Prospect Beresteiskyi – bulvar Tarasa Shevchenka) being its one of the main transportation hubs. 

Located on the opposite side of the Old Kyiv, the square is also one of extreme points of the neighborhood along with Maidan Nezalezhnosti. It is a crossing of several historic streets such as Saksahansky street, Taras Shevchenko boulevard, Zhuliany street, Boulevard-Kudriavets street - it is a beginning of Prospect Beresteiskyi - one of the longest and broadest avenues (parkway) in the city. It gained its current name in February 2023. Prior to that it was named Victory Square (translit.: Ploshcha Peremohy), this name was dedicated to victory in World War II.

History
The square was established in the mid-19th century, when in February 1858 the Russian Governor General of Kyiv Illarion Vasilchikov allowed the Kyiv Jewish community to conduct trade fairs. From 1869 to 1952 the square was known as Halytska Square, being located towards Halychyna (Eastern Galicia). Before the 1950s this area was also commonly known as Yevbaz (literally: Jewish market), after the Jewish market that used to be there but was dismantled at the end of the 1940s. From 1952 to 2023 the square was named Victory Square (translit.: Ploshcha Peremohy), this name was dedicated to victory in World War II.

The most notable building and one of focal features of Halytska Square is the Kyiv Circus. This was formerly the site of the Church of John Chrysostom, of cast iron construction, which was destroyed by the Soviet regime in 1934. Among other notable buildings are a department store "Univermah Ukrayina" and a hotel "Lybid".

The  Victory monument, an obelisk with the hero star (reflecting Kyiv's status as a Soviet Hero City) and "1941" and "1945" markings on its top, is situated on the square to commemorate the victory.

One of shops of the Kuznya na Rybalskomu separates Halytska Square from Vokzalna Square where the train station Kyiv-Pasazhyrskyi is located.

The square is served by numerous marshrutkas, trams, buses and trolley-buses.

On 9 February 2023 the Kyiv city council renamed the square back to Halytska Square.

Gallery

References

 Перемоги площа in Wiki-Encyclopedia Kiev

Squares in Kyiv
Shevchenkivskyi District, Kyiv
Prospect Beresteiskyi